Pitelka is a Czech surname, its female form is Pitelková. Notable people with the surname include: 

Dorothy Riggs Pitelka (1920–1994), American zoologist
Frank Pitelka (1916–2003), American ornithologist

Czech-language surnames